Traveller Supplement Adventure 4: Leviathan is a 1980 role-playing game adventure for Traveller published by Game Designers' Workshop.

Plot summary
Leviathan is an adventure that takes place in the Outrim Void, an area beyond the established borders of the Imperium, facing danger from pirate corsairs, Zhodani patrols, rival merchant cartels, unknown worlds, and even the Imperial Guard Survey Branch of the Imperial Scout Service.

Reception
Trevor Graver reviewed Leviathan for White Dwarf #23, giving it an overall rating of 9 out of 10, and stated that "One of the things I look forward to in each adventure is the library data section which seems to open a new leaf in the mysterious universe of Traveller. And a couple of more pages of library data in Leviathan would have earned it full marks from me. As it is, it's the best adventure yet."

William A. Barton reviewed Leviathan in The Space Gamer No. 38. Barton commented that "Whatever a ref's individual taste, he will surely find Leviathan a worthy addition to the expanding universe of Traveller - and a pretty good adventure to boot."

References

Role-playing game supplements introduced in 1980
Traveller (role-playing game) adventures